Janer is a surname. Notable people with the surname include: 

Ana Janer, Puerto Rican physician
David Janer (born 1973), Spanish actor
Erasmo Janer Gironella (1833-1911), Spanish entrepreneur and politician
Gabriel Janer Manila (born 1940), Spanish writer
Manuela Janer Cabanyes (1696-1760), Spanish businesswoman
Victor Christ-Janer (1915-2008), American architect

Catalan-language surnames